Bezławecki Dwór   is a settlement in the administrative district of Gmina Reszel, within Kętrzyn County, Warmian-Masurian Voivodeship, in northern Poland.

The settlement has a population of 6.

References

Villages in Kętrzyn County